Delta Lyrae cluster is a sparse open cluster of stars located about 1,220 light years away in the northern constellation of Lyra. Centered on the member star Delta2 Lyrae for which it is named. 

This cluster was first suspected in 1959 by American astronomer Charles B. Stephenson, then was later concluded not to exist by German astronomer Werner Bronkalla in 1963. However, subsequent photometric observations at the Palomar and Mount Wilson observatories led American astronomer Olin J. Eggen to demonstrate that there was an actual cluster, at least for the observed stars down to absolute magnitude +5.5. Eggen's study found at least 33 members.

The cluster has a visual magnitude of 3.8 and spans an angular diameter of 20 arc minutes. Based upon its estimated age and motion through space, it may be associated with the Gould Belt. It includes an Algol variable star, BD+36° 3317, discovered in 2007 from Spain: this is a spectroscopic binary star system that undergoes regular eclipses because the orbital plane is nearly aligned with the line of sight to the Earth.

See also
 Stephenson 2

References

Lyra (constellation)
Open clusters